Las Guáranas is a town in the Duarte Province of the Dominican Republic.
This town is situated between the town of Cotuí and San Francisco de Macorís, about 12 km from the city of San Francisco de Macorís and a greater distance from the City of Cotui already some 120 kilometers from the capital Santo Domingo.

The town has a population of approximately 20,000 persons.

It is located in a rice zone of great importance in this country and its economy is very focused on this activity.

The festival of Nuestra Sra. del Carmen, who is the patron saint of the town, is held from 7 to July 16.

Administrative divisions

The municipality of Las Guáranas is divided into different sectors: San Juan, Pueblo Nuevo, Ernesto Reyes, Sector Iglesias, Las Flores, Agua Viva Arriba Y Agua Viva Abajo, San Jose, Las Mercedes, Los Genao, Los Jardines, La Factoria, Aurelia, Los Riveras and urbanization Dario Antonio. El Cruse Del Canal its where the major business are located.

References

External links

Populated places in Duarte Province
Municipalities of the Dominican Republic